The Church of San Nicolás (Spanish: Iglesia de San Nicolás) is a church located in Guadalajara, Spain. It was declared Bien de Interés Cultural in 1981.

References 

Bien de Interés Cultural landmarks in the Province of Guadalajara
Buildings and structures in Guadalajara, Spain